Solus 29 is a Danish keelboat designed by Bjarne Marcussen in 1978. She was built as a successor to the successful Solus 24.

External links 
Solus 29 official site
Bådnyt test of Solus 29 prototype
Bådnyt test of Solus 29

Keelboats